Richard M. Dougherty (born January 17, 1935) is an American librarian and educator who was the director of libraries at both the University of California, Berkeley and the University of Michigan. He served as the president of the American Library Association from 1990 to 1991, focusing on bringing attention to information access issues and supporting children's literacy.

Education and career
Dougherty received his Bachelor of Science degree from Purdue University in 1959. He went on to earn his Master of Library Science in 1961 and his Ph.D. degree in 1963, both from Rutgers University.

He held a number of administrative positions in academic libraries, beginning at the University of Colorado as the associate director of libraries from 1966 to 1970. From 1972 to 1978 Dougherty held the position of University Librarian of the Bancroft Library at the University of California, Berkeley.

In 1978 he began working at the University of Michigan Ann Arbor University Library, serving as library director from 1978 to 1988. He was a professor of library science at the University of Michigan School of Library Science from 1978 to 1997, and for a short time served as the acting dean of the school (from 1984 to 1985). As a professor, Dougherty focused his instruction on issues of professional management, ethics, and values. He retired from the University of Michigan at the end of 1997.

After retiring he started his own consulting firm, Dougherty and Associates.

Library leadership
In addition to authoring many articles and books, Dougherty helped establish the Journal of Academic Librarianship when it began in 1975 and remained as an editor until 1994.

He was elected to serve as the 1990-1991 president of the American Library Association (ALA). During his time as ALA president, Dougherty promoted children's literacy and reading, as well as calling attention to the importance of information access issues.

Dougherty was named the Association of College and Research Libraries Academic or Research Librarian of the Year for 1983, specifically citing his editor role of professional journals, his service to ALA and its divisions, and his leadership as a library administrator at the University of Michigan, the University of Colorado, and the University of California. He was the first recipient of the ALA's Hugh C. Atkinson Memorial Award in 1988, recognizing the accomplishments of an academic librarian in improving library services. In 1997 he was awarded the Joseph W. Lippincott Award, given by ALA for "distinguished service to the profession of librarianship".

References

External links

Living people
American librarians
Presidents of the American Library Association
Purdue University alumni
Rutgers University alumni
University of Michigan faculty
1935 births